Yannick Cotter (born 3 January 2002) is a Swiss professional footballer who plays as a left winger for  club Juventus Next Gen.

Club career

Sion
Cotter is a product of Sion. In the 2018–19 season, Cotter scored 11 goals in 26 for the under-18s. Aged 17, Cotter played with the Sion U21 in the Swiss Promotion League. In the beginning of December 2019, 17-year old Cotter began training with the first team.

He made his official and professional debut on 8 December 2019, against Basel in the Swiss Super League; Cotter started on the bench, and replaced Seydou Doumbia in the 59th minute. He also came on from the bench in the following league game against Neuchâtel Xamax.

Juventus
In the beginning of January 2020, Cotter was officially sold to Italian side Juventus. Cotter reportedly signed a deal until June 2024, and was sold for a fee of around €4,9 million. He remained at Sion on loan for the rest of the season. However, due to the suspension of football in Switzerland during the COVID-19 pandemic, he made no official appearances for the club in his loan spell.

Having returned to Juventus in July 2020, Cotter was registered to the club's under-19 team for the 2020–21 season. He played 171 minutes, spread over 12 league games, and scored two goals in the Campionato Primavera 1. During a training session in June 2021, Cotter suffered an anterior cruciate ligament injury, which kept him out for about eight months. He returned to train with Juventus U23 – the reserve team of Juventus – in April 2022.

References

Notelist

External links
 

2002 births
Living people
People from Sion, Switzerland
Association football wingers
Swiss men's footballers
FC Sion players
Juventus F.C. players

Swiss Super League players
Swiss Challenge League players

Switzerland youth international footballers
Swiss expatriate footballers
Swiss expatriate sportspeople in Italy
Expatriate footballers in Italy
Sportspeople from Valais